Althepus stonei is a species of spider of the genus Althepus.

Distribution
The species is endemic to Thailand.  It is found in the cave Tham Nam Hua Ru Kua in Muang District in the Mae Hong Son Province and the Chiang Dao District in Chiang Mai Province.

References

Psilodercidae
Endemic fauna of Thailand
Spiders of Asia
Spiders described in 1995